Kincannon is a surname, being a variant of the Irish surname Concannon. Notable people with the surname include:

Andrew Armstrong Kincannon (1859-1938), American academic
C. Louis Kincannon (1940-2012), American statistician
Harry Kincannon (1909-1965), American baseball player
Indya Kincannon (born 1971), American politician
Theodore "Ted" Nieman Kincannon (1896-1936), American aviator
Todd Kincannon (born 1981), American political activist